Duane Hulbert is a Grammy-nominated American pianist.

Hulbert received the Gold Medal at the 1980 Gina Bachauer International Piano Competition, and also won prizes in the 1981 Leeds Competition and 1985 Carnegie Hall International American Music Competition.

He has performed as a soloist with symphonies across the United States and has given recitals at Merkin Hall in New York, Kennedy Center in Washington, D.C., and Benaroya Hall in Seattle.

In 2002, his recording of the piano works of late-romantic Russian composer Alexander Glazunov was nominated for a Grammy Award for Best Solo Instrumental Recording. David Hurwitz of ClassicsToday.com called the CD “a production that makes the best possible case for this really excellent but sadly neglected repertoire.”

Hulbert is currently Professor and Head of the Piano Department at the University of Puget Sound.

References

Living people
American classical pianists
Male classical pianists
American male pianists
Prize-winners of the Gina Bachauer International Piano Competition
21st-century classical pianists
21st-century American male musicians
21st-century American pianists
Year of birth missing (living people)